Krystian Feciuch (born 18 April 1989 in Trzcianka) is a Polish footballer currently playing for Noteć Czarnków.

Career
His youth teams were with Lubuszanin Trzcianka and Dyskobole U19. In 2007, he signed a professional contract with the latter and spent one season there. He moved to Pogoń Świebodzin the following season on a one-year deal. He then spent 2008—2011 with KSP. In July 2010, he was loaned to Stilon on a one-year deal. From there, he was loaned to Lubuszanin Trzcianka on a half-year deal. He returned to KSP in June 2011 but left not long after to play for Miedź Legnica for one season. He spent time with Pogoń Barlinek in 2012 before Miedź traded him to Chojniczanka Chojnice on a two-year contract. He stayed there until 2015, his longest stay in a club without being loaned away, then joined Odda FK for two full seasons. He premiered for them in July 2015. He returned to Lubuszanin Trzcianka to play between 2017 and 2020 and signed with Noteć Czarnków for the 2020—2021 and 2021—2022 seasons.

Personal life
His brother Jarosław coaches for the Lubuszanin Trzcianka organization.

References

External links
 

1989 births
Living people
Polish footballers
Polonia Warsaw players
Stilon Gorzów Wielkopolski players
People from Trzcianka
Sportspeople from Greater Poland Voivodeship
Association football midfielders
Miedź Legnica players
Chojniczanka Chojnice players